In discrete mathematics, Schur's theorem is any of several theorems of the mathematician Issai Schur. In differential geometry, Schur's theorem is a theorem of Axel Schur. In functional analysis, Schur's theorem is often called Schur's property, also due to Issai Schur.

Ramsey theory 

In Ramsey theory, Schur's theorem states that for any partition of the positive integers into a finite number of parts, one of the parts contains three integers x, y, z with 

Schur's theorem ensures that S(c) is well-defined for every positive integer c. The numbers of the form S(c) are called Schur's number.

Folkman's theorem generalizes Schur's theorem by stating that there exist arbitrarily large sets of integers, all of whose nonempty sums belong to the same part.

Using this definition, the only known Schur numbers are S(n)  2, 5, 14, 45, and 161 The proof that  was announced in 2017 and took up 2 petabytes of space.

Combinatorics 
In combinatorics, Schur's theorem tells the number of ways for expressing a given number as a (non-negative, integer) linear combination of a fixed set of relatively prime numbers. In particular, if  is a set of integers such that , the number of different tuples of non-negative integer numbers  such that  when  goes to infinity is:

This consequence of the theorem can be recast in a familiar context considering the problem of changing an amount using a set of coins. If the denominations of the coins are relatively prime numbers (such as 2 and 5) then any sufficiently large amount can be changed using only these coins. (See Coin problem.)

Differential geometry 
In differential geometry, Schur's theorem compares the distance between the endpoints of a space curve  to the distance between the endpoints of a corresponding plane curve  of less curvature.

If  then .

Schur's theorem is usually stated for  curves, but John M. Sullivan has observed that Schur's theorem applies to curves of finite total curvature (the statement is slightly different).

Linear algebra 

In linear algebra, Schur’s theorem is referred to as either the triangularization of a square matrix with complex entries, or of a square matrix with real entries and real eigenvalues.

Functional analysis
In functional analysis and the study of Banach spaces, Schur's theorem, due to I. Schur, often refers to Schur's property, that for certain spaces, weak convergence implies convergence in the norm.

Number theory 
In number theory, Issai Schur showed in 1912 that for every nonconstant polynomial p(x) with integer coefficients, if S is the set of all nonzero values , then the set of primes that divide some member of S is infinite.

See also

Schur's lemma (from Riemannian geometry)

References

 Herbert S. Wilf (1994). generatingfunctionology. Academic Press.
 Shiing-Shen Chern (1967). Curves and Surfaces in Euclidean Space. In Studies in Global Geometry and Analysis. Prentice-Hall.
 Issai Schur (1912). Über die Existenz unendlich vieler Primzahlen in einigen speziellen arithmetischen Progressionen, Sitzungsberichte der Berliner Math.

Further reading
 Dany Breslauer and Devdatt P. Dubhashi (1995). Combinatorics for Computer Scientists
 John M. Sullivan (2006). Curves of Finite Total Curvature. arXiv.

Theorems in discrete mathematics
Ramsey theory
Additive combinatorics
Theorems in combinatorics
Theorems in differential geometry
Theorems in linear algebra
Theorems in functional analysis
Computer-assisted proofs